Arviat Water Aerodrome  is located  north northwest of Arviat, Nunavut, Canada, and is operated by Joe Savikataaq.

See also
Arviat Airport

References

Registered aerodromes in the Kivalliq Region
Seaplane bases in Nunavut